The 1980 South Australian National Football League season was the 101st season of the top-level Australian rules football competition in South Australia.

Premiership season

Round 1

Round 2

Round 3

Round 4

Round 5

Round 6

Round 7

Round 8

Round 9

Round 10

Round 11

Round 12

Round 13

Round 14

Round 15

Round 16

Round 17

Round 18

Round 19

Round 20

Round 21

Ladder

1980 SANFL Finals

Week 1

Week 2

Week 3

Week 4 (1980 SANFL Grand Final)

Attendances

By Club

Awards and events

Awards 
Mark of the Year - Michael Farquhar

Events 

 On 3 May (Round 5), Port Adelaide player Tim Evans kicks a club record 16 goals, as the Magpies defeat West Adelaide 28.19 (187) to 10.10 (70).

Notes

References 

South Australian National Football League seasons
SANFL